Culladia inconspicuellus is a moth in the family Crambidae. It was described by Snellen in 1872. It is found in the Democratic Republic of Congo, as well as on La Réunion and Mauritius.

References

Crambini
Moths described in 1872
Moths of Africa